Hanjiwera is a notified area and village in Singhpora, Pattan, Baramulla district in Indian union territory of Jammu and Kashmir.

Hanjiwera is divided into two sublocalities namely Hanjiwera Bala and Hanjiwera Payeen. Hanjiwera Bala consists mainly the population of Sunni Muslims and some Hindu houses whereas hanjiwera Payeen mainly possesses Shia Muslims. The village is located on either sides of NH-1A highway connecting Baramulla and Srinagar.

Baramula, Sopore, Bandipora, Srinagar are the nearby cities to Hanjiwera.

Geography
It has an average elevation of 1553 metres (5095 ft) above mean sea level. Hanjwera is surrounded by Baramulla Tehsil to the west, Rohama Tehsil to the north, Kralpora Tehsil to the south, Pattan Tehsil to the east. Sherabad, Singhpora, Pattan, Zangam and Kongamdara are nearby villages.

How to reach

Railways

Pattan railway station, Mazhom railway station are the very nearby railway stations to Hanjiwera.

Roadways
Hanjiwera is connected both with the Srinagar city and baramulla city by NH-1A on South and North sides respectively. It provides a link road to Gulmarg via Hanjiwera-Magam-Kunzer-Tangmarg-Gulmarg.

References

Villages in Baramulla district